Solmaid is a neighborhood of Dhaka under Vatara Thana.

History
Solmaid had a traditional industry of making hand fans but the industry has declined in the 21st century. In 2018, Bangladesh Ansar started to build the headquarters of an armed wing, Ansar Striking Force Headquarter, in Solmaid but faced resistance from the locals who alleged the land belonged to them. Bangladesh Ansar claimed they bought the land from Basumati Housing Project of Hirajheel Property Development Private Limited.

Education
Solmaid High School

References 

Neighbourhoods in Dhaka
Dhaka